The list of ship launches in 1708 includes a chronological list of some ships launched in 1708.


References

1708
Ship launches